USS Namequa (YT-331/YTB-331) was built as Port Elizabeth (MC Hull 444), was laid down in early 1942, under a Maritime Commission contract as a type V2-ME-A1, by Calumet Shipyard and Dry Dock Co., Chicago, Illinois. Launched on 22 May 1942, sponsored by Mrs. James F. Rogan; she was renamed Namequa and classified as YT–331 on 29 September. The ship was acquired by the United States Navy on 15 October and placed in service on 17 February 1943.

The name "Namequa" comes from the only daughter of Black Hawk, leader of the Sauk and Fox tribes during the Black Hawk War (1831–1832).

Service history
Allocated to the 1st Naval District and based at Boston, she provided fire-fighting, tug, and salvage services to naval vessels and installations in that district throughout her seven-year career. Reclassified YTB–331 on 15 May 1944, her active service was continuous, except for a period in reserve from March to October 1946. She was struck from the Naval Vessel Register in June 1950.

See also
 Sotoyomo-class fleet tug
 Victory ships
 Liberty ship
 Type C1 ship
 Type C2 ship
 Type C3 ship
 United States Merchant Marine Academy
 List of auxiliaries of the United States Navy

References

Tugs of the United States Navy
Ships built in Chicago
1942 ships
Auxiliary tugboat classes
Harbor vessels of the United States